The Valsad Lok Sabha constituency (formerly Bulsar Lok Sabha constituency)  is one of the 26 Lok Sabha (parliamentary) constituencies in Gujarat state in western India. This seat is considered a bellwether seat in India. It is believed that the party which wins this seat will form the central government.

Assembly segments
Presently, Valsad Lok Sabha constituency comprises seven Vidhan Sabha (legislative assembly) segments. These are:

Members of Parliament

Election results

General Elections 2019

General Elections 2014

See also
 Valsad district
 List of Constituencies of the Lok Sabha

Notes

Lok Sabha constituencies in Gujarat
Valsad district
Valsad